The Chicago Limited was a train running from Hoboken, New Jersey to Chicago, Illinois run by the Lackawanna Railroad and west of Buffalo connecting with the Michigan Central Railroad's Wolverine, taking a route through Southwestern Ontario. The train left New York at 2 pm and would arrive in Chicago at 2 pm the next day. The Wabash Railroad's #1-11 hitched with the train for coach and sleeper service that veered from the Michigan Central route from Detroit westward. It took the Wabash's most southernly route through Montpelier, Ohio.

Eastbound, the train carried the name, Lackawanna Limited. Full service to Chicago ended in 1941. The DLW portion continued between Buffalo, New York and Hoboken was continued to 1949 and in that year was given a renaming as the DLW's Phoebe Snow.

References 

International named passenger trains
Named passenger trains of Canada
Named passenger trains of Ontario
Named passenger trains of the United States
Night trains of the United States
Passenger rail transportation in Illinois
Passenger rail transportation in Indiana
Passenger rail transportation in Michigan
Passenger rail transportation in New Jersey
Passenger rail transportation in New York (state)
Passenger rail transportation in Pennsylvania
Passenger trains of the Delaware, Lackawanna and Western Railroad
Michigan Central Railroad